Autotrader.co.za is an online automotive classifieds advertising website, which is part of Auto Trader South Africa. The company publishes an automotive classifieds magazine Auto Trader as well. Auto Trader South Africa was previously a subsidiary of the Auto Trader Group. In 2013, the Auto Trader Group sold their South African business, Auto Trader South Africa, which then became a wholly South African-owned business. The autotrader.co.za website is South Africa’s largest automotive marketplace website for buyers and sellers of both new and used cars and other types of vehicles. According to SimilarWeb, autotrader.co.za is South Africa's largest website in their Autos and Vehicles category.

History
On 16 April 1992, the South African Auto Trader was launched. The company, led by CEO George Mienie, has since transitioned from only an automotive classifieds magazine business to an online business via autotrader.co.za. In 2013, four local shareholders acquired autotrader.co.za. as well.

On 2 November 2017, The Competition Tribunal approved the merger between AutoTraderZA & Naspers subsidiary OLX Group

References

External links
 Official website

Automotive websites
Magazines established in 1992
Internet properties established in 1992
Used car market
Online marketplaces of South Africa
Economy of Johannesburg